Goa Pradesh Congress Committee is the unit of Indian National Congress for the State of Goa. Its headquarters are located at the Dayanand Bandodkar Road in Panaji, Goa. The incumbent President of the Goa Pradesh Congress Committee is Amit Patkar.

Structure and Composition

Goa Legislative Assembly election

MPs and MLAs from Goa

Factions
Goa Congress was a former regional political party in Goa. It was a splinter faction of Indian National Congress and was led by Wilfred de Souza. Later it merged with the Congress Party.

See also
 Indian National Congress
 Congress Working Committee
 All India Congress Committee
 Pradesh Congress Committee

References

External links

Indian National Congress of Goa